Tilia chinensis (Chinese linden) is a species of lime or linden tree that is endemic to China. It flowers in July or August when honey bees collect honey from its flowers. Especially famous is honey taken from the Chinese linden flowers in Changbai Mountain.

References

chinensis
Trees of China
Endemic flora of China
Plants described in 1889